Ukrainian Social Democratic Party may refer to:
 Ukrainian Social Democratic Party (1899), a political party in Galicia
 Ukraine – Forward!, established in 1998 as Ukrainian Social Democratic Party, renamed in 2012
 Social Democratic Party of Ukraine (united) (registered 1996)
 Social Democratic Party of Ukraine (registered 1994)
 Ukrainian Social Democratic Party (Canada)